Myriophyllum (water milfoil) is a genus of about 69 species of freshwater aquatic plants, with a cosmopolitan distribution. The center of diversity for Myriophyllum is Australia with 43 recognized species (37 endemic).

These submersed aquatic plants are perhaps most commonly recognized for having elongate stems with air canals and whorled leaves that are finely, pinnately divided, but there are many exceptions. For example, the North American species M. tenellum has alternately arranged scale like leaves, while many Australian species have small alternate or opposite leaves that lack dissection. The plants are usually heterophyllous, leaves above the water are often stiffer and smaller than the submerged leaves on the same plant and can lack dissection. Species can be monoecious or dioecious. In monoecious species plants are hermaphrodite, in dioecious species plants are either male or female, the flowers are small, 4(2)-parted and usually borne in emergent leaf axils. The 'female' flowers usually lack petals. The fruit is a schizocarp that splits into four (two) nutlets at maturity.

The fruits and leaves can be an important food source for waterfowl, which are thought to be an important source of seed and clonal dispersal.

Invasion and control

Three species (M. aquaticum, M. heterophyllum and M. spicatum) have aggressively invaded lakes, natural waterways and irrigation canals in North America. The U.S. states most affected have implemented control plans.

The Tennessee Valley Authority detected milfoil in its waters in the 1960s. It discounted milfoil's value as a food or feedstock and fought it with chemicals and lowering of water levels.  It suggested that water lilies (Nelumbo lutea) might deny it sunlight.
 
The widespread invasive Eurasian water milfoil (M. spicatum) is often controlled with herbicide containing diquat dibromide. Control can also be done through careful mechanical management, such as with "lake mowers," but this is a fragmenting plant, and the fragments may grow back.

Mechanical management can include the use of a long-reach lake rake or aquatic weed razor blade tool. Using these tools is similar to lawn work. These tools are most effective before seeds set. Infestations can be prevented through the use of a Weed Roller or a LakeMaid. These are automated and unattended machines. Permits may be required by various states. 

In 2007, Professor Sallie Sheldon of Middlebury College reported that an aquatic weevil (Euhrychiopsis lecontei), which eats nothing but milfoil, was an effective weapon against it.

Since roughly 2000, invasive milfoils have been managed by hand-harvesting.  Several organizations in the New England states have undertaken successful lake-wide hand-harvesting management programs.  Periodic maintenance is necessary; the species cannot be completely eradicated once established, but it can be reduced to manageable levels.  Well-trained divers with proper techniques have effectively controlled milfoil and maintained lakes, such as in the Adirondack Park in Northern New York where chemicals, mechanical harvesters, and other management techniques are banned as disruptive.  The Adirondack Watershed Institute (AWI) of Paul Smiths College touts the effectiveness of hand-harvesting.

Taxonomy 

A detailed molecular phylogenetic study enabled the construction of an infrageneric taxonomy but also revealed that another Haloragaceae genus, the monotypic Meziella Schindl., once thought to be extinct, was embedded within it, leading to its submersion within the former as Myriophyllum subgenus Meziella. This created three subgenera, further divided into sections and subsections:
Subgenera (type)
 Myriophyllum (M. spicatum L.)
 Meziella (Schindl.) M.L.Moody & D.H.Les (M. trifidum (Nees) M.L.Moody & D.H.Les.)
 Brachytheca Schindl. (M. variifolium Hook.f.)

List of selected species 

Myriophyllum alpinum
Myriophyllum alterniflorum DC., 1815
Myriophyllum amphibium
Myriophyllum aquaticum
Myriophyllum artesium
Myriophyllum austropygmaeum
Myriophyllum axilliflorum
Myriophyllum balladoniense
Myriophyllum bonii
Myriophyllum callitrichoides
Myriophyllum caput-medusae
Myriophyllum coronatum
Myriophyllum costatum
Myriophyllum crispatum
Myriophyllum dicoccum
Myriophyllum drummondii
Myriophyllum decussatum
Myriophyllum echinatum
Myriophyllum exasperatum
Myriophyllum farwellii
Myriophyllum filiforme
Myriophyllum glomeratum
Myriophyllum gracile
Myriophyllum heterophyllum
Myriophyllum hippuroides
Myriophyllum humile
Myriophyllum implicatum
Myriophyllum indicum Willd., 1805
Myriophyllum integrifolium
Myriophyllum jacobsii
Myriophyllum lapidicola
Myriophyllum latifolium
Myriophyllum laxum
Myriophyllum limnophilum
Myriophyllum lophatum
Myriophyllum mattogrossense
Myriophyllum mezianum
Myriophyllum muelleri
Myriophyllum muricatum
Myriophyllum oguraense
Myriophyllum oliganthum
Myriophyllum petraeum
Myriophyllum papillosum
Myriophyllum pedunculatum
Myriophyllum pinnatum
Myriophyllum porcatum
Myriophyllum propinquum
Myriophyllum pygmaeum
Myriophyllum quitense
Myriophyllum robustum
Myriophyllum salsugineum
Myriophyllum siamense 
Myriophyllum sibiricum
Myriophyllum simulans
Myriophyllum spicatum
Myriophyllum striatum
Myriophyllum tenellum
Myriophyllum tetrandrum
Myriophyllum tillaeoides
Myriophyllum trachycarpum
Myriophyllum trifidum
Myriophyllum triphyllum
Myriophyllum tuberculatum
Myriophyllum ussuriense
Myriophyllum variifolium
Myriophyllum verrucosum 
Myriophyllum verticillatum
Myriophyllum votschii

References

Bibliography 

 
 
 
 
 
 

 
Freshwater plants
Saxifragales genera